Oak Grove is an unincorporated community in Pendleton County, West Virginia, United States. Oak Grove lies on Smith Creek near its confluence with the South Branch Potomac River.

References

Unincorporated communities in Pendleton County, West Virginia
Unincorporated communities in West Virginia